Junior Aspirin Records is an artist-run independent record label founded in London in 2002 by Andy Cooke, Dan Fox, Ashley Marlowe and Nathaniel Mellors.

Artists
 The God in Hackney
 Skill 7 Stamina 12
 Socrates That Practices Music
 Nathaniel Mellors
 Dan Fox
 Invisible Polytechnic
 Advanced Sportswear
 Big Legs

The label has also released music by Charlottefield, DJ Scotch Egg, Imitation Electric Piano, Toilet, Jack Too Jack, Sue Tompkins, The Rebel, Emily Wardill, Bob Parks, Same Things, Mysterius Horse, Adventure, and D.J. Lonely + Blodfet.

Discography
ASP 001 Skill 7 Stamina 12 / Zebra Zebra. Split 7-inch vinyl.

ASP 002 Skill 7 Stamina 12 - Museum of Surfaces. 7-inch vinyl.

ASP 003 Skill 7 Stamina 12 - Robotics With Strings. CD album.

ASP 004 God in Hackney CD-R.

ASP 005 Same Things CD-R.

ASP 006 The Rebel - Prawns (album) vinyl LP.

ASP 007 Skill 7 Stamina 12 & Socrates That Practices Music - split 12-inch vinyl.

ASP 008 Remove Celebrity Centre - A Junior Aspirin Records Compilation. CD album.

ASP 009 Skill 7 Stamina 12 - Skill 7 Stamina Dead. Vinyl LP.

ASP 010 Mysterius Horse - CD-R.

ASP 011 Toilet - CD-R.

ASP 012 The Rebel - Mouthwatering Claustrophobic Changes (M.C.C.). Vinyl LP.

ASP 013 Adventure (Nicholas Bullen, Mark Beasley, Steve Beasley) CD album.

ASP 014 Skill 7 Stamina 12, Toilet, Same Things. Split 12-inch.

ASP 015 Bob Parks - The R&B Feeling. Vinyl LP.

ASP 016 God in Hackney - Untitled. Triangular lathe-cut 8" record.

ASP 017 Dan Fox - Easy Sneezing At The Century. Digital release.

ASP 018 Advanced Sportswear - CD album + insert in zip-lock bag.

ASP 019 The Rebel - The Incredible Hulk. Vinyl LP.

ASP 020 Invisible Polytechnic perform Terry Riley's IN C. Vinyl LP.

ASP 021 Socrates that practices music - Further conclusions against an Italian version (BAT). Vinyl LP.

ASP 023 The Rebel - The Race Against Time Hots Up. Vinyl LP.

ASP 024 Dan Fox - Moonlighting EP. Digital release.

ASP 025 Big Legs - Big Legs. Vinyl LP.

ASP 026 The God in Hackney - Cave Moderne. Vinyl LP.

ASP 028 The God in Hackney - Small Country Eclipse. Vinyl LP.

ASP 029 Nathaniel Mellors - Horrific Object. 7-inch vinyl.

Live shows
Live shows by the label bands have include appearances at the ICA London; Centre Pompidou, Paris; a mini-tour of China; The Kitchen, New York; and the Hammer Museum, Los Angeles.

Podcasts
Between 2008 and 2017, Junior Aspirin Records produced an irregular series of themed podcasts. Subjects included: 'Exercises in Style', 'Explaining Success and Failure', 'Explaining Limbo', 'Political Incorrect Correct', the four medieval humors, 'Explaining Melodrama', 'Explaining Capitalism (With Particular Reference to the Military Industrial Complex)', 'Empathy', Christmas, and the Brexit themed 'Brexpod.'

In collaboration with The Serving Library, the label has produced a similar series of themed podcasts under the umbrella title 'Audio Annotations'. Topics have included narrative, taste, materiality and nothingness, community, and sport.

See also
List of record labels

References

External links
Junior Aspirin Records website
Review of 'Remove Celebrity Centre - A Junior Aspirin Compilation' in The Wire magazine, March 2007
Junior Aspirin Records at the Institute of Contemporary Art, London

British independent record labels
2000 establishments in England